Regina Mundi High School is a school in Chicalim, Goa, India, run by the Congregation of Christian Brothers.

History 
Regina Mundi was established in the 1970s as an all-boys school. From 1991, the school adopted Konkani language as the medium of instruction for all students up to grade 4 (last year of primary school). After the turn of the century, the school started admitting girls and is now a co-ed school.

Order founder 
Edmund Ignatius Rice (1762–1844) was a Catholic missionary and educationalist. He was born in Callan, County Kilkenny, Ireland, in 1762 and died in Waterford, Ireland in 1844.

In 1802, he opened a school for the poor and marginalised but the children were so difficult to manage that the teachers resigned. He to devoted himself to training teachers who would dedicate their lives to prayer and to teaching the children free of charge.

He is the founder of two orders of religious brothers: the Congregation of Christian Brothers and the Presentation Brothers. The Christian Brothers grew throughout Ireland, England, southern Africa, India, America, and Australia. Today many schools owe their existence to his vision. His mission is continued by more than 1,900 Brothers in over 350 communities educating more than 200,000 students.

In his honour, the school holds an annual All Goa Quiz competition: Edmund Rice Quiz Competition.

Location 
The school is off Airport Road, quite close to the Vivus SMRC Heart Centre. It is 5 kilometres from the Mormugao harbour and a two-minute drive from Dabolim Airport.

Vasco da Gama is the nearest city, about 3 kilometres from the campus.

Facilities 
The main school building holds all the classrooms, staff rooms, library, and the science and computer labs. The assembly hall separates the primary and secondary sections.

The school has two full-size football pitches, known as the Brother Slattery sports field (named after one of the most loved Brothers and one who was at the school when it opened). There is a basketball court. There is a sports room in which students can play table tennis and chess. There is an art room in which students can do their art works in peace. There is also a craft room. There is a beautiful garden behind the school with a pond and many different flowers and plants. There is a prayer room in which the Brothers pray. The house of the brother is behind the school building.

The school is recognised by the statue of the Queen Mary, Virgin Mary, in the form of the statue of Regina Mundi greeting the visitors as they enter the compound.

Staff 
The current principal of the school is Br. Sebastian George. It is one of the oldest schools in Goa.

External links 
 Regina Mundi High School website

Congregation of Christian Brothers secondary schools
Catholic secondary schools in India
High schools and secondary schools in Goa
Buildings and structures in South Goa district
Education in South Goa district
1970s establishments in Goa, Daman and Diu
Educational institutions established in the 1970s